The Best of Tex Perkins: Songs from My Black Cattle Dog is a greatest hits album by Australian singer-songwriter Tex Perkins. The album includes solo tracks as well as The Cruel Sea and Tex, Don and Charlie tracks and was released in August 2009. The album was supported by a national tour.

The title Songs from My Black Cattle Dog is a creative blunder when someone misheard Tex saying songs from "my back catalogue".

Critical reception
Lyn Harder from The Dwarf said "Have you been thinking of getting a Tex Perkins record but not sure which one to get? Well, this album is for you." adding "This is Tex revealing certain aspects of his life as well as certain philosophical grabs of his life. Tex did choose the songs for this best of compilation and he says they are self analytical and rather honest in lyric content."

Iain Shedden from The Australian said "The best-of collection ... focuses largely on his balladeering solo output. It represents a large and impressive body of work that has earned plenty of plaudits, albeit without troubling the charts."

Track listing

Charts

Release history

References

2009 greatest hits albums
Tex Perkins albums
Universal Music Australia albums
Compilation albums by Australian artists